Specula is the plural form of speculum and may refer to:
 86196 Specula, a minor planet
 Specula (gastropod), a genus of minute sea snails, marine gastropod molluscs or micromolluscs in the family Cerithiopsidae
 Specula (watchtower), a watchtower in the Roman times